The Kulosaari cemetery is the smallest cemetery in Helsinki parish union. It is situated on Iso-pässi island (later Leposaari island) in Kulosaari district of Helsinki. It was inaugurated in 1925. The cemetery chapel was designed by architect Armas Lindgren and added in 1927. There is also an area for war heroes' graves.

Description
Kulosaari cemetery covers an area of about two hectares.

Notable interments
Erik Heinrichs (1890–1965), general
Hannes Kolehmainen (1889–1966), Olympic medalist runner
Armas Lindgren (1874–1929), architect and artist
Paavo Talvela (1897–1973), general
Ilmari Turja (1901–1998), journalist and playwright
Kustaa Vilkuna (1902–1980), historian and linguist

See also
Kulosaari Church

References

External links 
 
 Kulosaari cemetery 
 

Buildings and structures in Helsinki
Cemeteries in Finland
Lutheran cemeteries
Tourist attractions in Helsinki
Kulosaari